Captain Smith may refer to:
Captain Edward Smith (1850–1912) of the RMS Titanic
Captain John Smith of Jamestown (1580–1631)
Captain Roy Campbell Smith (1858–1940), Governor of Guam